Guillermo Beraza (born October 25, 1975 in Junín, Buenos Aires) is an Argentine former footballer who played for clubs in Argentina, Chile and Venezuela. He played as a midfielder.

Teams
  Sarmiento de Junín 1995–1997
  Gimnasia y Esgrima de La Plata 1997–1999
  Centro Córdoba 1999–2000
  Deportes Antofagasta 2000–2001
  Unión Española 2001–2002
  Deportivo Italia 2002–2003
  Deportivo Táchira 2003–2004
  Unión Atlético Maracaibo 2004–2008
  Deportivo Táchira 2008
  Belgrano de Córdoba 2009–2010
  Sarmiento de Junín 2010

External links
 

1975 births
Living people
Argentine footballers
Argentine expatriate footballers
Argentina international footballers
Club de Gimnasia y Esgrima La Plata footballers
Club Atlético Belgrano footballers
UA Maracaibo players
Unión Española footballers
C.D. Antofagasta footballers
Deportivo Táchira F.C. players
Expatriate footballers in Chile
Expatriate footballers in Venezuela
People from Junín, Buenos Aires
Sportspeople from Buenos Aires Province
Association football midfielders